Silver Creek Township may refer to:

Illinois
 Silver Creek Township, Stephenson County, Illinois

Indiana
 Silver Creek Township, Clark County, Indiana

Iowa
 Silver Creek Township, Ida County, Iowa
 Silver Creek Township, Mills County, Iowa
 Silver Creek Township, Pottawattamie County, Iowa

Kansas
 Silver Creek Township, Cowley County, Kansas

Michigan
 Silver Creek Township, Cass County, Michigan

Minnesota
 Silver Creek Township, Wright County, Minnesota
 Silver Creek Township, Lake County, Minnesota

Missouri
 Silver Creek Township, Randolph County, Missouri

Nebraska
 Silver Creek Township, Burt County, Nebraska
 Silvercreek Township, Dixon County, Nebraska
 Silver Creek Township, Merrick County, Nebraska

North Carolina
 Silver Creek Township, Burke County, North Carolina

Ohio
 Silvercreek Township, Greene County, Ohio

South Dakota
 Silver Creek Township, Sanborn County, South Dakota

See also
 Silver Creek (disambiguation)

Township name disambiguation pages

es:Municipio de Silver Creek